Mouna Fettou (born November 28, 1970) is a Moroccan actress who starred in a number of movies, plays, and TV shows. Some of her most famous roles were in the films  (1995), and Women... and Women (1997). She was married to Saad ash-Shraibi, who produced a number of her films. She currently hosts the TV show Jari Ya Jari on Media 1.

She was honored with special recognition at the 2019 Marrakech International Film Festival for her 30 years of acting.

Works 

 Love in Casablanca 1991
 In Search of My Wife's Husband  (Part 2) 1997
 Women... and Women 1997
 There is a Simple Truth 1997
 Thirst 2001
 And Now... Ladies and Gentlemen 2002
 I Saw Ben Barka Get Killed 2005
 The Gates of Heaven 2006
 ماجدة 2006
 Tariiq an-Nisaa' 2007
 Lethal Game 1994
 They Passed in Silence 1997
 Gardens of al-Karma (series) 2001
 Rahimo 2007
 Yak Hna Jiran (series) 2010, 2011, and 2012
 Master Chef Morocco (participant) 2017

References

External links 

 

1970 births
Moroccan television actresses
Moroccan film actresses
Living people